The Painting is a 2011 French animated film directed by Jean-François Laguionie.

Plot
For mysterious reasons, a Painter has left a work incomplete - causing conflict between the Toupins (Allduns), who are entirely painted, the Pafinis (Halfies), who lack a few colors, and the Reufs (Sketchies), who are only sketches. Toupins occupy the chateau, Pafinis are out in the gardens, and Reufs are treated as outcasts and hunted by the Toupins. Three friends, one of each class, go on a quest to find the artist so he can finish the piece and hopefully unite the people.

Cast
 Jessica Monceau as Lola
 Adrien Larmande as Ramo
 Thierry Jahn as Plume
 Julien Bouanich as Gom
 Céline Ronte as Garance
 Thomas Sagols as Magenta
 Magali Rosenzweig as Orange de Mars
 Chloé Berthier as Claire

Production
The film was co-produced by France's Blue Spirit and Belgium's Be-Films. It took two years to finance and had a budget of four million euro. Jean-François Laguionie designed every character himself. The designs include homages to painters such as Marc Chagall, Amedeo Modigliani, Pablo Picasso and Henri Matisse. Pre-production took 15 months and production one year. The film was animated in digital 3D.

Release
The film was released in France by Gebeka Films on 23 November 2011. It competed at the 2012 Annecy International Animated Film Festival. Distribution rights for the United States have been acquired by GKIDS.

Reception

Accolades
 In June 2013, the film was given the Award for Best Feature Film at the 8th Festival of European Animated Feature Films and TV Specials.

References

External links
 

2011 films
2011 animated films
Belgian animated films
Films directed by Jean-François Laguionie
2010s French animated films
2010s French-language films
French-language Belgian films